Disburden Disciple is the fifth solo studio album by Jarboe, released independently in 2000.

Track listing

Personnel
Adapted from the Disburden Disciple liner notes.

 Jarboe – lead vocals, piano, Hammond organ, production, musical arrangements
Musicians
 Ibrahim Ahmad – percussion
 Brian Castillo – guitar, bass guitar, production, engineering
 Michael Courter – bass guitar
 Gabriel – percussion
 Hamdi – percussion
 Yariv Malka – guitar, percussion
 Renee Nelson – harp
 Diana Obscura – cello
 Chandler Rentz – drums, percussion
 Cedric Victor-DeSouza – bass guitar

Additional musicians
 Renee Nelson – backing vocals (7)
 Diana Obscura – backing vocals (7)
 Nick Pagan – piano (6)
 Rico – spoken word (2)
 Eva Saban – violin (8)
Production and additional personnel
 Erica George Dines – photography
 Yariv Malka – Co-producer (8), engineering (8)

Release history

References 

2000 albums
Jarboe albums
Albums produced by Jarboe